Islands of Britain is a 2009 documentary series, filmed over the summers of 2008 and 2009 and hosted by Martin Clunes, which visited a number of the islands that lie off the coast of Great Britain and Northern Ireland, as well as the Channel Islands.

Episodes

Episode 1: The North
Visited Muckle Flugga, Forewick Holm, and Unst in the Shetland Islands then Lewis and Harris, Eigg and Barra in the Outer Hebrides.

Episode 2: The West
Visited Piel Island in Cumbria, Islay in the Inner Hebrides, the Isle of Man, and Rathlin off the coast of Northern Ireland.

Episode 3: The South
Visited Guernsey and Sark in the Channel Islands, St. Michael's Mount, and St Martin's, St Mary's, St Agnes, and Bishop Rock in the Isles of Scilly.

International adaptation
An Australian version of the series titled Martin Clunes: Islands of Australia aired on the Seven Network in 2016, and was co-produced by Buffalo Pictures and hosted by Clunes.

References

External links
 

2009 British television series debuts
2009 British television series endings
ITV documentaries
British documentary television series
Television series by ITV Studios
English-language television shows